INS Sardar Patel is a Forward Operating Base (FOB) of the Indian Navy in Porbandar, Gujarat and the Headquarters of the Naval Officer-in-Charge (Gujarat, Diu & Daman). It provides the logistic support to the Indian Navy units deployed in the Northern Arabian Sea, including along the International Maritime Boundary Line with Pakistan.

History 
INS Sardar Patel is the second naval base in Gujarat after INS Dwarka, which is near Okha. The name Sardar Patel has been chosen to signify the role of India’s Iron Man Vallabhai Patel, the first Deputy Prime Minister and Home Minister of India.

The base was commissioned on 9 May 2015 by Anandiben Patel, the Chief Minister of Gujarat. The commissioning ceremony was attended by Admiral RK Dhowan, Chief of the Naval Staff, Vice Admiral SPS Cheema, Flag Officer Commanding–in–Chief, Western Naval Command, senior naval officers and other dignitaries of the state government.

Cmde BR Prakash, VSM who is the Naval Officer-in-Charge (Gujarat, Diu & Daman) is the first Commanding Officer of INS Sardar Patel.

Objective 
After the 26/11 terror attack on Mumbai, the Indian Navy was entrusted the responsibility of a lead agency to coordinate coastal and offshore security requirements and also augment naval presence in sensitive areas.

Gujarat is a front line maritime state of India with the longest coastline of 880 nautical miles, besides sharing 532 km of land border with Pakistan. Over the preceding decade, there has been a significant growth in the maritime infrastructure along the coast of Gujarat. Many ports have come up along the coastline, which collectively handle 300 million tons of cargo annually, constituting approximately 30 per cent of the total cargo handled in the ports of India.

In addition, there are 12 single point moorings (SPMs) in the Gulf of Kutch, through which about 120 million tons of crude oil is supplied to various refineries on the coast and in the hinterland, constituting 71 per cent of the oil import into the country. The creation of considerable infrastructure along the coastline makes them vulnerable from sea, not only during hostilities but also during peacetime.

The commissioning of INS Sardar Patel at Porbandar enables the Navy to augment its infrastructure and organisational effectiveness in Gujarat. It will improve coordination and synergy with other maritime agencies.

See also 
 Indian navy 
 List of Indian Navy bases
 List of active Indian Navy ships

 Integrated commands and units
 Armed Forces Special Operations Division
 Defence Cyber Agency
 Integrated Defence Staff
 Integrated Space Cell
 Indian Nuclear Command Authority
 Indian Armed Forces
 Special Forces of India

 Other lists
 Strategic Forces Command
 List of Indian Air Force stations
 List of Indian Navy bases
 India's overseas military bases

References 

Vajrabahu
2015 establishments in Gujarat